Higherford is a village in the Pendle district of Lancashire, England.

Although it is a village in its own right and shown on maps, it is sometimes confused with its larger neighbour Barrowford. Both villages meet each other on the A682 road, which runs through them from Nelson and towards Blacko and Gisburn. It is generally accepted that the boundary between the two villages is north of the road bridge over Pendle Water.

References

External links

 BBc Sunday Stroll in Blacko, Higherford and Barrowford

Towns and villages in the Borough of Pendle